Abercynon Rugby Football Club is a Welsh rugby union team based in Abercynon. Today, Abercynon RFC plays in the Welsh Rugby Union Division Two East league and are a feeder club for Cardiff Blues.

The present club badge, designed in the early 1970s, depicts a swing bridge that used to span the river Taff to enable access to the colliery from the Carnetown area of Abercynon. Also on the club badge is the Glamorgan County coat of arms, and the coat of arms of an area bordering on Abercynon known as the Tynte.

Previous players include back to back Welsh Varsity winning player Jack Perkins. After departing Abercynon, he spent a season with the Keys before spearheading Swansea RFC's campaign to return to the Welsh Premiership.

Club honours
Glamorgan County Silver Ball Trophy 1972-73 - Winners
Glamorgan County Silver Ball Trophy 1976-77 - Winners
WRU Division Three South East 2010-11 - Champions

Club staff
Chairman - Shannon Rakei
Secretary - Kevin Cadogan
Fixture Secretary - Jeff Robinson
President - Neil Edwards
Club Steward - Damien Withey

References

External links
 Abercynon RFC Official Club website 

Rugby clubs established in 1886
Welsh rugby union teams
1886 establishments in Wales
Sport in Rhondda Cynon Taf